Lovrečan is a village in Varaždin County, Croatia.

References

Populated places in Varaždin County